Pinnacle Mountain is an  granitic multi-peak massif located in the Chelan Mountains, in Chelan County of Washington state. The mountain is situated in Glacier Peak Wilderness of the North Cascades, on land managed by Wenatchee National Forest. Fred Beckey's Cascade Alpine Guide has the elevation of the highest pinnacle as 8,402 feet. Pinnacle Mountain ranks as the fourth-highest peak in the Chelan Mountains, and 75th-highest summit in Washington state. Its nearest higher neighbor is Saska Peak,  to the southeast, and Emerald Peak is positioned  to the east-southeast. Precipitation runoff from the peak drains into the Entiat River and Chelan River drainage basins.

Climate
Most weather fronts originate in the Pacific Ocean, and travel northeast toward the Cascade Mountains. As fronts approach the North Cascades, they are forced upward by the peaks of the Cascade Range, causing them to drop their moisture in the form of rain or snowfall onto the Cascades (Orographic lift). As a result, the North Cascades experiences high precipitation, especially during the winter months in the form of snowfall. During winter months, weather is usually cloudy, but, due to high pressure systems over the Pacific Ocean that intensify during summer months, there is often little or no cloud cover during the summer.

Geology

Pinnacle Mountain is composed primarily of granodiorite and hornblende quartz diorite, minerals of the Cardinal Peak pluton. The North Cascades feature some of the most rugged topography in the Cascade Range with craggy peaks, spires, ridges, and deep glacial valleys. Geological events occurring many years ago created the diverse topography and drastic elevation changes over the Cascade Range leading to the various climate differences. The history of the formation of the Cascade Mountains dates back millions of years ago to the late Eocene Epoch. With the North American Plate overriding the Pacific Plate, episodes of volcanic igneous activity persisted. In addition, small fragments of the oceanic and continental lithosphere called terranes created the North Cascades about 50 million years ago. During the Pleistocene period dating back over two million years ago, glaciation advancing and retreating repeatedly scoured the landscape leaving deposits of rock debris. The "U"-shaped cross section of the river valleys are a result of recent glaciation. Uplift and faulting in combination with glaciation have been the dominant processes which have created the tall peaks and deep valleys of the North Cascades area.

See also

 Geography of the North Cascades
 List of Highest Mountain Peaks in Washington

References

External links
 Pinnacle Mountain aerial photo: PBase
 Pinnacle Mountain aerial photo: PBase
 Weather: Pinnacle Mountain

Mountains of Washington (state)
Mountains of Chelan County, Washington
Cascade Range
North Cascades
North American 2000 m summits